Oxydia vesulia, the spurge spanworm moth, is a species of geometrid moth in the family Geometridae. It is found in the Caribbean Sea, Central America, North America, and South America.

The MONA or Hodges number for Oxydia vesulia is 6967.

Subspecies
These three subspecies belong to the species Oxydia vesulia:
 Oxydia vesulia alternata Warren, 1905
 Oxydia vesulia transponens Walker, 1860
 Oxydia vesulia vesulia (Cramer, 1779)

References

Further reading

External links

 

Ourapterygini
Articles created by Qbugbot
Moths described in 1779